St. Anthony's Church also known more formally as Church of St. Anthony and St.Victor, is a religious building that is affiliated with the Catholic Church in the town of Tamuning in Guam, a dependency of the United States in the Pacific Ocean.

The church follows the Roman or Latin rite. It is within the Catholic Archdiocese of Agana (Archidioecesis Aganiensis) which was raised to its current status by Pope John Paul II by the bull "compertum quidem". All religious services are offered in English.

See also
Roman Catholicism in Guam
St. Anthony's Church (disambiguation)

References

Roman Catholic churches in Guam